Fridericus Rex – elfter Teil is an East German film. It was released in 1957.

The film was made by the Produktionsgruppe Stacheltier.

External links
 

1957 films
German short films
East German films
1950s German-language films
1950s German films